Castor Cracking Group (CCG) was a demo group from Sweden, and were active on the ZX Spectrum during 1986–88.  They were one of the first groups for the ZX Spectrum with their release of Castor Intro early in 1986.

Originally they named themselves after Castor in the constellation Gemini, but despite having "Crack" in their name, they actually (at least according to themselves) never cracked any software.

Technically, their demos were not very advanced - they even programmed many of them in BASIC and compiled the result for release.  However, their significance lies in their early entry onto the scene.

UK Lead 
UK Lead was a label used by Castor Cracking Group for the more "serious" projects. The only two projects released were Spectrum Juggler and 99Y.

Members 
 Staffan "Cobra" Vilcans (later "Ralph 124C41+")
 Martin "DoWN" Vilcans (the Dragon of Winter Night (earlier "Marulk")) 
 Johan "Heradotos" Forslund (C64)

List of demos

Demos
 Castor Intro (1986)
 Castor Intro 2 - Trap Door (1987)
 Castor Intro 3 - Ocean (1987)
 Castor Intro 4 - Balls (1987)
 Castor Intro 5 - Boing Boomchack (1987)
 Castor Intro 6 - Monster Banquet (1987)
 Castor Intro 7 - never made
 Castor Intro 8 - Dan There (1987)
 Castor Intro 9 - Move That Army (1987)
 Castor Intro 10 - Auf Wiedersehen Castor (1988)
 Spectrum Juggler (1987) (under the name UK Lead).

Music demos
 Don't Stop the Music (1987)
 128 Demo
 128 Music (1987)
 128 Music II (1987)

Games
 99Y - http://zx.interface1.net/99y.html (under the name UK Lead)

References

External links
 Pouet
 ZX Demo
 Adventureland
 SÄK

Demogroups
ZX Spectrum